Iron Mountain is a peak in the Black Hills of South Dakota, notable for the fact that U.S. Route 16A was purposely built directly over its summit to provide scenic views of Mount Rushmore National Memorial.

References

Black Hills
Mountains of South Dakota
Landforms of Pennington County, South Dakota